The Vancouver version of the NWA Pacific Coast Heavyweight Championship was the major singles title in two National Wrestling Alliance-affiliated Vancouver territories. The championship was originally used in Big Time Wrestling from 1948 to about 1958, then was reactivated for use in NWA All Star Wrestling from 1970 until 1981, when the title was abandoned.

Title history

See also
National Wrestling Alliance
NWA All Star Wrestling

References

External links
NWA Pacific Coast Heavyweight title history (Vancouver)

National Wrestling Alliance championships
Heavyweight wrestling championships
Regional professional wrestling championships
Professional wrestling in British Columbia